"Monstah Black"  (was born in Colonial Williamsburg, Virginia) is an American recording artist, choreographer, dancer, and performance artist based in Bedford-Stuyvesant, New York. In 2015, he received the Tom Murrin Performance Award.

Early life 
BLACK started performing at the age of five. He attended Bruton High School, Williamsburg, where he performed the song "International Lover" by Prince. He describes his adolescence as one of both struggles and "joyful moments", and describes his teen years as "progressive, alternative, androgynous". His fashion aesthetic was influenced by Prince, Boy George and the New York Dolls.

Career 
BLACK 2016 show 'HYPBERLOIC! (the last spectacle)' was described by Eric Marlin, in the New York Theater Review, as "more visual than verbal, more collage than narrative", where "not every fragment must be in the service of a central thesis." Black creates funk, electro/pop/soul, disco infused punk music.

Personal life 
Black is married to D.J./producer Manchildblack. As "The Illustrious Blacks", they have collaborated on music recordings, such as the EP "NeoAfro Futuristic Psychedelic Surrealistic Hippy” released on Concierge Records, and the 2016 live performance “Hyperbolic”. Monstah Black's birth name is Reginald Ellis Crump.  Black attended Long Island University and received a degree in New Media Art and Performance Master of Fine Art Degree Program.

Awards 

 2015 Tom Murrin Performance Award.

References 

1967 births
Living people
American performance artists
Performance art in New York City
African-American artists
African-American art
American LGBT artists
21st-century African-American people
20th-century African-American people